Richard Connell (1650–1714) was an Irish Member of Parliament for St Canice 1692–1693, 1695–1699 and 1703–1713.

He was active in the politics of the corporations of St Canice and Kilkenny, having followed his father in being Registrar of the Diocese of Ossory, the Sheriff of Kilkenny city, and an alderman of the same.
He was also mayor of Kilkenny twice, in 1685–1686–1687.

His father, William Connell, had himself been mayor of Kilkenny twice, in 1671–1672–1673, and had been Sheriff in 1659–1660.
His mother was daughter of John Bishop of Glandonnell, and he was their eldest son.

While he was mayor, on 1685-02-05 he was awarded a grant of arms described heraldically as:

References

Reference bibliography 

 
 
 
 

1650 births
1714 deaths
Irish MPs 1692–1693
Irish MPs 1695–1699
Irish MPs 1703–1713
Members of the Parliament of Ireland (pre-1801) for County Kilkenny constituencies